Hyperion Entertainment CVBA (formerly Hyperion Entertainment VOF) is a Belgian software company which in its early years focused in porting Windows games to Amiga OS, Linux, and Mac OS. In 2001, they accepted a contract by Amiga Incorporated to develop AmigaOS 4 and mainly discontinued their porting business to pursue this development. AmigaOS 4 runs on the AmigaOne systems, Commodore Amiga systems with a Phase5 PowerUP accelerator board, Pegasos II systems and Sam440/Sam460 systems.

History 
Hyperion Entertainment was founded in April 1999 with Ben Hermans and Evert Carton in charge. In their own words, "After Belgian lawyer Benjamin Hermans wondered why no one had ever tried to license PC games to do Amiga ports." Hyperion does not maintain programmer staff but sub-contracts software programmers for projects as necessary. Hans-Joerg Frieden, who had previously worked on ports of the games Descent and Abuse as well as the Warp3D library, was contracted to be Hyperion's main developer. For the next few years, Hyperion would port several game titles to the Amiga and later Linux and the Macintosh, starting with Amiga port of Heretic II in 2000.

Game development
The port of Heretic II was generally well received by the Amiga press, but had weak sales. Following this, Hyperion set out to target a broader range of platforms: Amiga, Linux, and Mac OS. Later in 2000, Hyperion completed the Linux version of SiN. The Amiga port has been postponed due to hardware requirements and ultimately not released. They also approached Monolith Productions to port their Lithtech engine, culminating in their port of Shogo: Mobile Armor Division for Amiga, Linux, and Mac OS in 2001. The game had not sold as well as had been hoped, most notably on Linux, despite becoming a best seller on Tux Games. Hyperion stated that Linux users were likely to dual boot with Windows to play easily available games rather than purchase more expensive specialised versions years after release. In early 2002 Hyperion introduced the Amiga port of Descent: FreeSpace – The Great War. An improved version for AmigaOS 4 followed in 2010. After id Software released source code, Hyperion marketed later in 2002 a commercial Amiga port of Quake II. A Linux port of Gorky 17 was developed by Hyperion and published by Linux Game Publishing in 2006, while a version for AmigaOS 4 was released nearly a decade later in 2015.

During work on the Heretic II port, Hyperion Entertainment developers created an OpenGL subset called MiniGL which sits on top of Warp3D to ease porting of 3D games. The MiniGL library was released for free use to other software developers.

AmigaOS 4 
In 2001 Hyperion announced that, after licensing the rights from Amiga, Inc, it would be working on the long-awaited successor to AmigaOS 3.9, and to this end concentrated most of its effort on the development of AmigaOS 4. Hyperion claimed and still claim that it is based upon AmigaOS 3.1 source code, and to a lesser extent certain AmigaOS 3.9 sources. A quick port of 68k AmigaOS to PowerPC was originally planned, with new features added as development continued. Ben Hermans, writing on Amiga forum Ann.lu, claimed that these sources, along with the source of the PPC kernel WarpOS would be sufficient to provide a version to users within a year, making his now-infamous "change some flags and recompile" comment.

AmigaOS 4.0 was first released to end-users and second level betatesters in April 2004, with AmigaOS 4.1 following in September 2008. It is currently still in development.

In 2004, Hyperion attempted to obtain a licence for an AmigaOS 4 native port of the file manager Directory Opus, which had originally and been developed on the Amiga, but for which development had since moved to the Microsoft Windows platform. However talks between Hyperion and GP Software broke down.

The first managing partner of Hyperion, Benjamin Hermans, in the period between announcement and release of AmigaOS 4, ignited a great deal of community controversy by repeatedly claiming that MorphOS, an AmigaOS-like competitor (which had been released in complete form in 2003), was illegal, and had on several occasions threatened to take legal action against it either on the grounds that it was parasitic competition to AmigaOS 4, or even that it was actually based on stolen AmigaOS source code. No evidence to support either claim ever became public, neither did any legal action against MorphOS take place, although neither prevented such views being repeated commonly in public Amiga forums and mailing lists and even accepted as fact by some. This situation was inflamed by ex-Commodore engineer Dave Haynie, who backed up Herman's claims: "If you have seen the Amiga source code, you cannot produce a legally separate work-alike", though again without any direct evidence.

The dispute did not enter the courts, but in the forums the argument was bitter. Hermans claimed that Bill Buck, who lead the Genesi company funding MorphOS, was a "con-artist".

Evert Carton took over the managing partner position after Hermans stepped down in 2003, due to lack of time for daily administrative work. Timothy de Groote became another partner in 2003.

Dispute and settlement with Amiga, Inc. 

In 2007, Hyperion was sued by Amiga Incorporated for trademark infringement in the Washington Western District Court in Seattle, Washington. Amiga, Inc. sued Hyperion for breach of contract, trademark violation and copyright infringement concerning the development and marketing of AmigaOS 4.0, stating that Hyperion had continued to develop and market AmigaOS 4 without paying agreed royalties and had continued to do so even after being warned to cease and desist.

Hyperion launched a counter action, claiming fraud in the Amiga, Inc. handling of Amiga intellectual properties and debts, including the use of debt-holding shell companies, by shifting responsibility between these shell companies. They also claimed that Amiga, Inc. had failed to uphold their part of the contract and had been untruthful in correspondence; and that they had failed to deliver the AmigaOS 3.1 source that AmigaOS 4 was developed from, forcing Hyperion to find it elsewhere. In spite of that ongoing legal dispute, in autumn 2007, Hyperion released a standalone version of AmigaOS 4 for classic Amiga, an action Amiga, Inc. claimed as illegal.

On 29 May 2007, the new managing partner stated under oath - without further evidence - that the open-source AmigaOS reimplementation AROS was "probably illegal", as documented on page 27 of court documents related to the Amiga-Hyperion court case.

On 30 September 2009, Hyperion and Amiga, Inc reached a settlement. Hyperion was granted an exclusive license to develop and market AmigaOS 4 and subsequent versions with the name AmigaOS. However, the "Amiga" trademark remained with Amiga, Inc. and was then also licensed to other parties, including Commodore USA and iContain. This meant that "Amiga" branded hardware could and would be sold without AmigaOS 4.

In 2009, Hyperion changed its legal status from a business partnership (VOF) to a company with limited liability (CVBA).

On 24 April 2011, Evert Carton announced he was stepping down as the managing partner of Hyperion. In charge of the company were then Ben Hermans and Timothy de Groote.

Insolvency Declaration of 2015
On 27 January 2015, Hyperion Entertainment was declared insolvent. Ben Hermans has claimed that this was an administrative mistake by a third party and that the company would appeal the insolvency decision. The declaration was overturned on 2 April 2015 and the company posted a clarification on its website.

Recent events 
AmigaOS 4 developer and Aminet administrator Costel Mincea joined Hyperion in mid 2015 as a third director. Hyperion reported in January 2017 that Hermans has resigned as a director, in charge of the company remained Timothy De Groote and Costel Mincea. In October 2017 Hyperion was removed from Belgium's official company register due to not filling annual reports for the last three years. Hyperion remedied this by supplying required reports to the National Bank of Belgium. In July 2020 Amiga-news.de reported Costel Mincea resigned from his post at Hyperion and remaining director Timothy de Groote was in a legal dispute with former Hyperion's managing partner Ben Hermans. In February 2021 Timothy de Groote was no longer director of Hyperion and Ben Hermans assumed full control of the company.

Games 
Hyperion's game ports include these: Heretic II, Shogo: Mobile Armor Division, Gorky 17, Quake II, SiN and Descent: FreeSpace – The Great War. Hyperion also announced that it acquired the license to port Worms Armageddon and Soldier of Fortune, but these were not released.

References

External links

Company Blog

Amiga companies
AmigaOS 4
Companies based in Brussels
Linux game porters
Privately held companies of Belgium
Video game companies of Belgium
Video game development companies
Video game companies established in 1999
Belgian companies established in 1999